In the 1879 Iowa State Senate elections Iowa voters elected state senators to serve in the eighteenth Iowa General Assembly. Elections were held in 29 of the state senate's 50 districts. State senators serve four-year terms in the Iowa State Senate.

The general election took place on October 14, 1879.

Following the previous election, Republicans had control of the Iowa Senate with 38 seats to Democrats' 12 seats.

To claim control of the chamber from Republicans, the Democrats needed to net 14 Senate seats.

Republicans maintained control of the Iowa State Senate following the 1879 general election with the balance of power shifting to Republicans holding 41 seats, Democrats having 7 seats, and 2 Greenbackers (a net gain of 3 seats for Republicans and 2 for Greenbackers).

Summary of Results 
 Note: The holdover Senators not up for re-election are not listed on this table.

Source:

Detailed Results 
 NOTE: The Iowa Official Register does not contain detailed vote totals for state senate elections in 1879.

See also 
 Elections in Iowa

References

External links
Iowa Senate Districts 1878-1883 map

Iowa Senate
Iowa
Iowa Senate elections